Afiat Yuris Wirawan (born 17 April 1989 in Boyolali Regency) is an Indonesian badminton player.

Personal life 

His hobbies are swimming, watching movies, and fishing.

Career 
In 2006, Wirawan competed at the BWF World Junior Championships in the boys' doubles event but lost to the Vietnamese paired in first round. He became the champion of the Brazil International tournament in the  men's doubles event partnered with Danny Bawa Chrisnanta and in the mixed doubles event partnered with Purwati. In 2007, he won a bronze medal at the BWF World Junior Championships in the mixed doubles event partnered with Debby Susanto after being defeated by Lim Khim Wah and Ng Hui Lin of Malaysia in the semifinal round. He won the Waikato International tournament in the men's doubles event partnered with Wifqi Windarto after beating Ashton Chen and Khoo Kian Teck of Singapore with the score 21–14, 21–15.

In 2008, Wirawan won the Laos Future Series tournament in the men's doubles event partnered with Windarto. He became the runner-up at the Smiling Fish and Indonesia International tournaments in the men's doubles event. At Smiling Fish, they were defeated by Fernando Kurniawan and Lingga Lie. At Indonesia, they were defeated by their compatriots Fran Kurniawan and Rendra Wijaya in the final match. He also became the semifinalist at the Vietnam Grand Prix tournament in the men's doubles event after being defeated by Fran Kurniawan and Rendra Wijaya with the score 19–21, 21–6, 21–14. In 2009, he became the semifinalist at the Vietnam International and Macau Open Grand Prix Gold tournaments in the men's doubles event. At Macau, they were defeated by Choong Tan Fook and Lee Wan Wah of Malaysia with the score 21–13, 21–15.

In 2010, Wirawan became the semifinalist at the India Open Grand Prix Gold tournament in the men's doubles event partnered with Yohanes Rendy Sugiarto after being defeated by K. T. Rupesh Kumar and Sanave Thomas in rubber game 21–9, 18–21, 24–22. In 2011, he won a gold medal in the mixed team event and a bronze medal in the men's doubles event at the Summer Universiade games held in Shenzhen, China. He also became the semifinalist of the Indonesian Masters Grand Prix Gold tournament in the men's doubles event after being defeated by Hiroyuki Endo and Kenichi Hayakawa of Japan in straight games 21–16, 21–18. In 2012, he became the runner-up of the Vietnam Open Grand Prix tournament in the men's doubles event partnered with Sugiarto. In the final match, they were defeated by Bodin Isara and Maneepong Jongjit of Thailand with the score 19–21, 21–16, 21–11.

In 2014, Wirawan won the Bahrain International Challenge tournament in the men's doubles event partnered with Sugiarto. They beat another Indonesian pair, Fran Kurniawan and Agripinna Prima Rahmanto Putra, with the score 23–21, 21–15. He also won the USM Indonesia International tournament partnered with Sugiarto after defeating Kusdianto Seiko Wahyu and Tedi Setiadi with the score 21–18, 21–17.

Achievements

Summer Universiade 
Men's doubles

BWF World Junior championships 
Mixed doubles

BWF Grand Prix 
The BWF Grand Prix had two levels, the Grand Prix and Grand Prix Gold. It was a series of badminton tournaments sanctioned by the Badminton World Federation (BWF) and played between 2007 and 2017.

Men's doubles

  BWF Grand Prix Gold tournament
  BWF Grand Prix tournament

BWF International Challenge/Series 
Men's doubles

Mixed doubles

  BWF International Challenge tournament
  BWF International Series tournament
  BWF Future Series tournament

References

External links 
 
 Profile on PBSI

1989 births
Living people
People from Boyolali Regency
Sportspeople from Central Java
Indonesian male badminton players
Universiade medalists in badminton
Universiade gold medalists for Indonesia
Universiade bronze medalists for Indonesia
Medalists at the 2011 Summer Universiade